The Ohio Revised Code contains all current statutes of the Ohio General Assembly of a permanent and general nature, consolidated into provisions, titles, chapters and sections. However, the only official publication of the enactments of the General Assembly is the Laws of Ohio; the Ohio Revised Code is only a reference.

The Ohio Revised Code is not officially printed, but there are several unofficial but certified (by the Ohio Secretary of State) commercial publications: Baldwin's Ohio Revised Code Annotated and Page's Ohio Revised Code Annotated are annotated, while Anderson's Ohio Revised Code Unannotated is not. Baldwin's is available online from Westlaw and Page's is available online from LexisNexis.

History
The Ohio Revised Code replaced the Ohio General Code in 1953. However the current organization and form of the Ohio Revised Code Title 29 (Crimes) was completely re-written and issued into law by the General Assembly in 1974.

Ohio law

The Constitution of Ohio is the foremost source of state law. Legislation is enacted by the Ohio General Assembly, published in the Laws of Ohio, and codified in the Ohio Revised Code. State agencies promulgate rules and regulations (sometimes called administrative law) in the Register of Ohio, which are in turn codified in the Ohio Administrative Code (OAC). Ohio's legal system is based on common law, which is interpreted by case law through the decisions of the Ohio Supreme Court, Ohio District Courts of Appeals, and trial courts, which are published in the Ohio Official Reports. Counties, townships, and municipalities may also promulgate local ordinances.

Organization

See also
 United States Code

References

External links
 Ohio Revised Code from LAWriter
 Ohio Revised Code from FindLaw

Ohio General Assembly
Ohio law
 
United States state legal codes
Publications of the Ohio state government